Tunbyholm Castle is a manor house at Tomelilla Municipality in Scania,  Sweden.

The facility consists of a two-story building with yellow facades, white pilasters and window surrounds as well as two free-standing wings with square floors, flat saddle roof and pediment-crowned central section. 
The present appearance  is the result of a classic restoration in the 1830s.

See also
List of castles in Sweden

References

 Buildings and structures in Skåne County